In Greek mythology, Acamas or Akamas (Ancient Greek: , folk etymology: 'unwearying') was a hero in the Trojan War.

Family 
Acamas was the son of King Theseus of Athens and Phaedra, daughter of Minos. He was the brother or half brother to Demophon.

Mythology
After his father lost the throne of Athens, Acamas grew up as an exile in Euboea with his brother under the care of Elephenor, a relative by marriage. He and Diomedes were sent to negotiate the return of Helen before the start of the Trojan War, though Homer ascribes this embassy to Menelaus and Odysseus. During his stay at Troy he caught the eye of Priam's daughter Laodice, and fathered her son Munitus. The boy was raised by Aethra, Acamas' grandmother, who was living in Troy as one of Helen's slaves.  Munitus later died of a snakebite while hunting at Olynthus in Thrace.

In the war, Acamas fought on the side of the Greeks and was counted among the men inside the Trojan Horse. After the war, he rescued Aethra from her long captivity in Troy. Later mythological traditions describe the two brothers embarking on other adventures as well, including the capture of the Palladium. Some sources relate of Acamas the story which is more commonly told of his brother Demophon, namely the one of his relationship with Phyllis of Thrace. This might be a mistake.

Acamas is not mentioned in Homer's Iliad, but later works, including Virgil's Aeneid, and almost certainly the Iliou persis, mention that Acamas was one of the men inside the Trojan horse.  The dominant character trait of Acamas is his interest in faraway places.

Eponyms and Acamas in art
The promontory of Acamas in Cyprus, the town of Acamentium in Phrygia, and the Attic tribe Acamantis all derived their names from him.

Notes

References 

Diodorus Siculus, The Library of History translated by Charles Henry Oldfather. Twelve volumes. Loeb Classical Library. Cambridge, Massachusetts: Harvard University Press; London: William Heinemann, Ltd. 1989. Vol. 3. Books 4.59–8. Online version at Bill Thayer's Web Site
Diodorus Siculus, Bibliotheca Historica. Vol 1-2. Immanel Bekker. Ludwig Dindorf. Friedrich Vogel. in aedibus B. G. Teubneri. Leipzig. 1888-1890. Greek text available at the Perseus Digital Library.
Euripides, Heracleidae with an English translation by David Kovacs. Cambridge. Harvard University Press. 1994. Online version at the Perseus Digital Library. Greek text available from the same website.
Gaius Julius Hyginus, Fabulae from The Myths of Hyginus translated and edited by Mary Grant. University of Kansas Publications in Humanistic Studies. Online version at the Topos Text Project.
Graves, Robert, The Greek Myths, Harmondsworth, London, England, Penguin Books, 1960. 
Graves, Robert, The Greek Myths: The Complete and Definitive Edition. Penguin Books Limited. 2017. 
 Homer, The Iliad with an English Translation by A.T. Murray, Ph.D. in two volumes. Cambridge, MA., Harvard University Press; London, William Heinemann, Ltd. 1924. . Online version at the Perseus Digital Library.
Homer, Homeri Opera in five volumes. Oxford, Oxford University Press. 1920. . Greek text available at the Perseus Digital Library.
 Pausanias, Description of Greece with an English Translation by W.H.S. Jones, Litt.D., and H.A. Ormerod, M.A., in 4 Volumes. Cambridge, MA, Harvard University Press; London, William Heinemann Ltd. 1918. . Online version at the Perseus Digital Library
Pausanias, Graeciae Descriptio. 3 vols. Leipzig, Teubner. 1903.  Greek text available at the Perseus Digital Library.
Pseudo-Apollodorus, The Library with an English Translation by Sir James George Frazer, F.B.A., F.R.S. in 2 Volumes, Cambridge, MA, Harvard University Press; London, William Heinemann Ltd. 1921. . Online version at the Perseus Digital Library. Greek text available from the same website.
 Stephanus of Byzantium, Stephani Byzantii Ethnicorum quae supersunt, edited by August Meineike (1790-1870), published 1849. A few entries from this important ancient handbook of place names have been translated by Brady Kiesling. Online version at the Topos Text Project.
 Publius Vergilius Maro, Aeneid. Theodore C. Williams. trans. Boston. Houghton Mifflin Co. 1910. Online version at the Perseus Digital Library.
Publius Vergilius Maro, Bucolics, Aeneid, and Georgics. J. B. Greenough. Boston. Ginn & Co. 1900. Latin text available at the Perseus Digital Library.

Children of Theseus
Achaean Leaders
People of the Trojan War
Attican characters in Greek mythology

cs:Akamás#Akamás z Athén
ja:アカマース#テーセウスの子